Chaïne Staelens (born November 7, 1980 in Kortrijk, Belgium) is a volleyball player, who plays as a wing-spiker for the Netherlands. She was a member of the Dutch National Women's Team that won the gold medal at the FIVB World Grand Prix 2007 in Ningbo, PR China. She is the older sister of Kim Staelens, who also plays for the national volleyball squad.

Clubs 
Unilever Rio de Janeiro
  Denso Airybees (2009-2010)
  Pioneer Red Wings (2010-)

Awards

Individuals
 2009 Montreux Volley Masters "Best Server"

References

External links
FIVB Profile

1980 births
Living people
Dutch women's volleyball players
Sportspeople from Kortrijk
Wing spikers
Expatriate volleyball players in Japan
Dutch expatriate sportspeople in Japan
Belgian women's volleyball players
Dutch people of Belgian descent
Belgian people of Dutch descent
Expatriate volleyball players in Brazil
Dutch expatriate sportspeople in Brazil
Expatriate volleyball players in Germany
Dutch expatriate sportspeople in Germany
Expatriate volleyball players in Italy
Dutch expatriate sportspeople in Italy
Expatriate volleyball players in Russia
Dutch expatriate sportspeople in Russia